In mathematics, a family   of sets is of finite character if for each ,  belongs to   if and only if every finite subset of  belongs to  . That is,

Properties
A family  of sets of finite character enjoys the following properties:

Example
Then  is a family of finite character (because a subset  is linearly dependent if and only if  has a finite subset which is linearly dependent). 
Therefore, in every vector space, there exists a maximal family of linearly independent elements. As a maximal family is a vector basis, every vector space has a (possibly infinite) vector basis.

See also
 Hereditarily finite set

References
 
 

Families of sets